Rrapush Papoj (born 12 April 1965, in Kavajë) is a retired Albanian cyclist. He served as head coach of Albania National Cycling Team from 2008–2010.

References

Sportspeople from Kavajë
Albanian male cyclists
Living people
1965 births
21st-century Albanian people